Poland is a nation that has competed at the Hopman Cup tournament on two occasions, in 2014 and 2015. The nation reached the final in its inaugural appearance, but lost to France by two rubbers to one. However, it did win the 2015 tournament, defeating the United States by 2-1 in that year's final.

Players
This is a list of players who have played for Poland in the Hopman Cup.

Results

References

Hopman Cup teams
Hopman Cup
Hopman Cup